Devosia confluentis is a Gram-negative and aerobic bacteria from the genus of Devosia which has been isolated from the Sea of Japan (East Sea) on Korea.

References

External links
Type strain of Devosia confluentis at BacDive -  the Bacterial Diversity Metadatabase

Hyphomicrobiales
Bacteria described in 2016